Saikhan is a sum (district) of Bulgan Province in northern Mongolia.
Judoka Naidangiin Tüvshinbayar, Mongolia's first Olympic gold medalist, hails from Saikhan. In 2009, its population was 3,747.

References 

Districts of Bulgan Province